Dean River Airport is an airport located at the mouth of the Dean River on the northeast side of the Dean Channel in the Central Coast region of the province of British Columbia, Canada. It has an IATA airport code of YRD.

References

Airports in British Columbia